Bremen Next is a German, public radio station owned and operated by the Radio Bremen (RB).

References

Radio Bremen
Radio stations in Germany
Radio stations established in 2016
2016 establishments in Germany
Mass media in Bremen (city)